Trent Hodkinson (born 31 August 1988) is an Australian former professional rugby league footballer who played as a  in the NRL. 

He played for the Manly Warringah Sea Eagles in two separate spells, the Canterbury-Bankstown Bulldogs, Newcastle Knights and the Cronulla-Sutherland Sharks in the National Rugby League. Hodkinson played for NSW City and New South Wales in the State of Origin series.

Background
Hodkinson was born in Campbelltown, New South Wales, Australia. 

He played his junior rugby league for the Cabramatta Two Blues while attending Westfields Sports High School. He was then signed by the Parramatta Eels.

Playing career

Early career
In October 2007, Hodkinson played for the Junior Kangaroos against the Junior Kiwis. After progressing through the Parramatta Eels S. G. Ball Cup and Harold Matthews Cup squads, he played for the Eels' NYC team in 2008. In July 2008, he signed a contract with the Manly Warringah Sea Eagles starting in 2009. In 2009, he played for the Sea Eagles' Queensland Cup team, Sunshine Coast Sea Eagles and was named the club's Player of the Year. On 15 July 2009, he played at halfback for the Queensland Residents against the New South Wales Residents in Queensland's 34-6 win at Suncorp Stadium. On 12 September 2009, he played in the Sea Eagles' 2009 Queensland Cup Grand Final win over the Northern Pride RLFC.

2010 : NRL Debut
In Round 2 of the 2010 NRL season, Hodkinson made his NRL debut for the Sea Eagles against his former club the Parramatta Eels, in the Sea Eagles' 24-20 loss at Parramatta Stadium. He scored a try on debut. On 7 May 2010, after impressing in only six matches, he played for New South Wales city against New South Wales Country, kicking 3 goals in City's 36-18 loss at Port Macquarie Regional Stadium. On 15 June 2010, he signed a 3-year contract with the Canterbury-Bankstown Bulldogs starting in 2011. In Round 15 against the South Sydney Rabbitohs at Brookvale Oval, he kicked 2 field goals to win the match for the Sea Eagles 26-25. He finished off his debut year in the NRL, having played in 24 matches, scoring 4 tries and kicking 3 field goals.

2011 : New Club
In Round 1 of the 2011 NRL season, Hodkinson made his Bulldogs debut against the Wests Tigers, playing at halfback in the Bulldogs' 24-14 win at ANZ Stadium. He scored his first Bulldogs try in Round 7 against the South Sydney Rabbitohs, in the Bulldogs' 36-24 win at ANZ Stadium. In Round 20 against the Parramatta Eels at ANZ Stadium, he repeated his feat of the previous year and kicked 2 field goals in the Bulldogs' golden point extra time 8-7 win. He finished off 2011 having played in 22 matches, scoring 2 tries and kicking 3 field goals.

2012 : Injury Interrupted Season
Hodkinson only played in 6 matches in the 2012 NRL season, after undergoing shoulder and knee operations for injuries that interrupted his season.

2013
Hodkinson played his first match for Bulldogs in the 2013 season in Round 6 against the Sydney Roosters at SFS in the Bulldogs 38-0 loss. Hodkinson was appointed the new goal kicker for the Bulldogs due to his impressive goal kicking when he was bidding his time the NSW Cup. On 4 September 2013, Hodkinson re-signed with the Bulldogs until the end of the 2015 season. Hodkinson finished the 2013 NRL season with him playing in 20 matches, scoring 4 tries, kicking 64 goals and kicking 3 field goals.

2014 : State of Origin, Co-captain and NRL Grand Final
After being injured over the 2012 season Hodkinson was unable to cement his spot as starting halfback for the Canterbury-Bankstown Bulldogs, until the 2014 season shining on multiple occasions to get the Bulldogs to seven successive victories. Hodkinsion was subsequently selected to make his State of Origin debut for New South Wales in Game I of the 2014 series. Hodkinson and fellow Bulldogs player Josh Reynolds replaced the incumbent halves pairing of Mitchell Pearce and James Maloney for the 2014 series and led NSW to a 12-8 victory in Game 1 at Suncorp Stadium. Hodkinson was called up to the Blues squad again for Game 2. After 71 minutes of play Hodkinson crossed over to score the match's first try, to level the scores with the Maroons. A conversion decided the score 6-4. The Blues held on to win after eight years of Maroon dominance, with Hodkinson scoring the Blues only points. Hodkinson played in Game 3, kicking 2 goals in NSW 32-8 loss at Suncorp Stadium. Hodkinson led the Bulldogs into the Top 8 at the end of the season. During the Bulldogs vs Melbourne Storm Elimination Final round, Hodkinson kicked 4 goals and scored a try to assist his team to a 28-4 win. In the Semi-Final the Bulldogs played a close game with the Manly Warringah Sea Eagles, with Hodkinson kicking two field goals to win for the Bulldogs 18-17. In the Preliminary Final the Bulldogs beat the Penrith Panthers 18-12 with Hodkinson kicking 3 goals to secure their place in the 2014 NRL Grand Final. In the week leading to the Grand Final, when Canterbury captain Michael Ennis was ruled out of the 2014 NRL Grand Final due to a foot injury, Hodkinson along with team mate James Graham were named co-captains of the Bulldogs for the match. Hodkinson kicked 1 goal in the Bulldogs 30-6 Grand Final loss. Hodkinson finished his 2014 NRL season for the Bulldogs with him playing 25 matches, scoring 5 tries, kicking 68 goals and kicking 4 field goals.

2015 : Last season at the Bulldogs
In Round 3 against the Manly-Warringah Sea Eagles, Hodkinson played his 100th NRL match in the Bulldogs 16-12 win at Brookvale Oval. Hodkinson played at halfback and was the main goal kicker in all 3 matches for the New South Wales Blues in the 2015 State of Origin series loss. Hodkinson was subsequently dropped from the NSW side for the 2016 series.

On 6 July 2015, Hodkinson signed a 3-year contract with the Newcastle Knights starting in 2016. In Round 24 against Hodkinson's future club the Newcastle Knights, Hodkinson suffered a season ending wrist injury in the Bulldogs 20-18 win at Hunter Stadium. He finished off his last year with the Bulldogs having played in 18 matches, scoring 1 try, kicking 47 goals and kicking 1 field goal. On 15 December, he was named at halfback for the World All Stars team to play the Indigenous All Stars on 16 February 2016.

2016 : Knights Captain in very poor season for the club
On 26 February, Hodkinson was announced as one of three co-captains for the Knights alongside Tariq Sims and Jeremy Smith. In Round 1 of the 2016 NRL season, he made his club debut for the Knights against the Gold Coast Titans, playing at halfback and kicking 2 goals in the Knights' 12-30 loss at Cbus Super Stadium. In Round 11 against the Wests Tigers, he scored his first try for the Knights. During the middle of the season, he was linked to a possible allegiance switch to England for the 2016 Four Nations series. He qualifies for England through his English father. Hodkinson finished his first season with the Knights having played in 23 matches, scoring 1 try, kicking 47 goals and kicking 1 field goal.

2017 : Demotion to reserve grade, loss of Newcastle captaincy
On 23 February 2017, Hodkinson was named as the sole captain of the Knights for the 2017 season. After Round 7 and with the Knights only notching one win during that period, Hodkinson was demoted to the Knights Intrust Super Premiership NSW team with the club going for youngsters Brock Lamb and Jaelen Feeney in the halves but only had one win with them there while as Hodkinson was in reserve grade. Hodkinson would later return in Round 17 against the Wests Tigers where the Knights lost 33-12 at Hunter Stadium. Hodkinson did not receive the captaincy back with Sione Mata'utia and Jamie Buhrer taking over the role until Round 25 and 26 after Sione Mata’utia was ruled out for the final 2 rounds due to concussion. Hodkinson finished the 2017 NRL season with him playing in 17 matches, scoring 1 try, kicking 46 goals and kicking 1 field goal for the Knights.

On 11 November 2019, Hodkinson spoke of his time at Newcastle and called it a "toxic environment".  Hodkinson also spoke of his displeasure towards former Newcastle head coach Nathan Brown saying “I started the year all right, and I think it might have been early in the season I got brought into the coach’s office and he said to me: ‘I want you to go back to NSW Cup and work on your confidence, “I was like: ‘Oh, OK’ … I think he felt the pressure and had to make a big call, Unfortunately for me, I took the fall for where we were at the time".

Hodkinson explained his situation at the club further saying “I thought I’d go back for a couple of weeks and get my confidence back, which I didn’t really agree with, but two weeks rolls around, nothing said, “Four weeks, six weeks, didn’t hear a thing. Walked past each other, nothing was said. Ten weeks rolled around and I was just going: ‘What’s doing here?, In the meantime, there were certain things getting leaked to the media – the local media up there – that I wasn’t too happy about.  I know for a fact that it was coming from him".

2018
On 5 February 2018, Hodkinson was released from his final year of his contract with the Newcastle Knights to sign on a 1-year deal with the Cronulla-Sutherland Sharks as a back-up half. In round 3 of the 2018 season, he made his debut for the Sharks in their 14-4 win over the Parramatta Eels at ANZ Stadium.

On 15 May, Hodkinson was granted a release from the Sharks so he could return to Manly effectively immediately on a 2-year contract, the Sharks allowing him to take up a longer term deal than they could offer. He made his return to the Manly club in their 24-4 win over the Melbourne Storm at AAMI Park on 19 May. He played off the interchange bench and kicked 3 from 4 goals in the match.

2019
Hodkinson started the 2019 season at Manly from the bench in the match against West Tigers. He entered the game as a substitute during the second half at hooker, and had an error-free 15 minutes on the field.  After Manly's Round 2 loss against the Sydney Roosters, Hodkinson was demoted to reserve grade to play for Manly's reserve grade side the Blacktown Workers Sea Eagles.

On 5 September, Hodkinson announced his retirement from rugby league after succumbing to career-ending knee injuries.  Hodkinson spoke to the media saying “Unfortunately due to a new injury sustained earlier this year, numerous medical procedures and intensive rehabilitation, I have been forced to give up the game that I love and will be medically retiring from rugby league".

References

External links
Manly Sea Eagles profile
Cronulla Sharks profile
Newcastle Knights profile
NRL profile
Des Hasler tips halves rookie Trent Hodkinson to shine Herald Sun, 24 March 2010
Trent Hodkinson Herald Sun

 

1988 births
Australian rugby league players
Australian people of English descent
New South Wales City Origin rugby league team players
New South Wales Rugby League State of Origin players
Manly Warringah Sea Eagles players
Canterbury-Bankstown Bulldogs players
Newcastle Knights players
Newcastle Knights captains
Cronulla-Sutherland Sharks players
Junior Kangaroos players
Cabramatta Two Blues players
Sunshine Coast Sea Eagles players
Rugby league halfbacks
Living people
Rugby league players from Sydney